The Delivery Man is the 21st studio album by Elvis Costello, released on Lost Highway Records, B0002593-02. It was recorded with the Imposters at Sweet Tea Studio in Oxford, Mississippi. It peaked at No. 40 on the Billboard 200.

Content
The album had its genesis in a conceptual story apparently written for Johnny Cash. Costello himself states:
"The Delivery Man started out as a story about the impact on three woman's lives of a man with a hidden past. The story took the song "Hidden Shame" as its unsung prelude. Parts of the narrative ended up being displaced from the final album by more urgent songs taken from the news headlines. One of the songs moved aside was to find an ideal home on Secret, Profane & Sugarcane."

The album features guest vocals by Lucinda Williams and Emmylou Harris. "Monkey to Man" derived from a 1950s rhythm and blues hit "The Monkey" by Dave Bartholomew, and "The Judgment", a song written by Costello and Cait O'Riordan (his wife 1986-2002) which had been previously recorded by Solomon Burke on his 2002 release Don't Give Up on Me. The vinyl and United Kingdom compact disc pressings of the album included an additional track, "She's Pulling Out the Pin". The album was issued the same day as Il Sogno.

Shortly after its release, Lost Highway issued a deluxe edition of the album, including a bonus disc containing seven tracks from the Clarksdale Sessions ten-inch vinyl record, a collection of songs recorded live at Delta Recording in Clarksdale, Mississippi. The Clarksdale Sessions, subtitled "Delivery Man Companion", contained new versions of tracks from the proper album as well as an unreleased Costello original "In Another Room", and covers of the Bartholomew original "The Monkey" and "Dark End of the Street". Tom Waits has named it one of his favourite albums.

Track listing
All tracks written by Elvis Costello unless otherwise indicated.

 "Button My Lip" – 4:54
 "Country Darkness" – 3:57
 "There's a Story in Your Voice" – 3:43
 "Either Side of the Same Town" (Costello, Jerry Ragovoy) – 3:59
 "Bedlam" – 4:48
 "The Delivery Man" – 4:38
 "Monkey to Man" – 4:28
 "Nothing Clings Like Ivy" – 4:17
 "The Name of This Thing Is Not Love" – 2:50
 "Heart Shaped Bruise" – 4:07
 "She's Pulling Out the Pin" (vinyl pressings, UK CD, and deluxe edition CD only) – 3:22
 "Needle Time" – 5:05
 "The Judgment" (Costello, Cait O'Riordan) – 3:58
 "The Scarlet Tide" (Costello, T-Bone Burnett) – 2:25

Delta-Verité – The Clarksdale Sessions (Deluxe edition bonus disc)
 "The Monkey" (Dave Bartholomew, Pearl King) – 2:34
 "Country Darkness" – 4:21
 "Needle Time" – 5:13
 "The Scarlet Tide" (Costello, Burnett) – 2:22
 "In Another Room" – 4:25
 "The Delivery Man" – 4:57
 "The Dark End of the Street" (Dan Penn, Chips Moman) – 3:06

Personnel
 Elvis Costello – vocals, guitars, piano, glockenspiel, tambourine, bass, ukulele
 Steve Nieve – organ, piano, accordion, harmonium, Hammond organ, theremin, melodica, omnichord
 Davey Faragher – bass, vocals
 Pete Thomas – drums
 Emmylou Harris – vocals (on "Nothing Clings Like Ivy", "Heart Shaped Bruise", and "The Scarlet Tide")
 John McFee – pedal steel guitar (on "Country Darkness" and "Heart Shaped Bruise")
 Lucinda Williams – vocal (on "There's a Story in Your Voice")

Charts

References

External links
 

Elvis Costello albums
2004 albums
Albums produced by Elvis Costello
Lost Highway Records albums
Albums produced by Dennis Herring